Bukit Bendera may refer to:
Penang Hill
Bukit Bendera, Brunei, area in Tutong, town of Tutong District, Brunei
Bukit Bendera (federal constituency), represented in the Dewan Rakyat
Former Malay name for Fort Canning Hill, Singapore
Former Malay name for Mount Faber, Singapore